Joseph Parkin Burton (10 December 1873 – 25 January 1940) was an English cricketer who played first-class cricket for Derbyshire during the 1901 season.

Burton was born at Somercotes, Derbyshire, the son of Thomas Burton, a plumber and painter, and his wife Elizabeth. He made his debut for Derbyshire in the 1901 season in a draw against Nottinghamshire in July in which he made his career-best score of 51 not out from sixth in the batting order. In the same match, English Test cricketer Billy Gunn hit a career best innings of 273, and in response  Levi Wright hit an innings of 193 for Derbyshire. Burton made two solid innings of 34 and 33  a week later against Gloucestershire and opened with 41 against Hampshire. However, in the other four matches he only achieved low scores and did not play another season.

Burton  was a right-handed batsman and played twelve innings in seven first-class matches with an average of 18.18 and a top score of 51 not out.

Burton died at Somercotes aged 67.

References

1873 births
1940 deaths
English cricketers
Derbyshire cricketers
People from Somercotes
Cricketers from Derbyshire